Macao Institute for Tourism Studies (IFT;) is a public institution of higher education located in Macau, China which is administered by the Secretary for Social Affairs and Culture of the Macao SAR Government. The institution offers degrees in tourism, heritage and hospitality

Unlike most colleges and universities, this institute requires all year one students wear uniform to attend all the classes.

History
The institution was established in 1995. Fanny Vong has been the President of the institution since 2001.

Schools of IFT

EST (Tourism College)
The Tourism College, one of the schools of the Institute for Tourism Studies, offers the following four-year bachelor's degree Programmes:

 Bachelor of Arts in Culinary Arts Management,
 Bachelor of Science in Tourism Business Management,
 Bachelor of Science in Heritage Management,
 Bachelor of Science in Hotel Management,
 Bachelor of Science in Tourism Event Management,
 Bachelor of Science in Tourism Retail and Marketing Management.

Besides accepting local and international students, it also receives exchange students for a one-semester study. To date, students from Mainland China, Canada, South Korea, USA and many European countries had participated in our exchange programme.

ETIH (Tourism and Hotel School)
Tourism and Hotel School was initially established in 1982 and reported to the Macao Government Tourist Office. The school started with a small teaching body of 7 and offered 2 courses, namely, Reception and Housekeeping, at its temporary premises located next to the Pousada de Mong-Há. In the following years, more courses were added to the list such as culinary, languages and tour guiding.

In 1993, as a strategy to support tourism development, Macao government decided to create a higher education institute which would focus only on tourism education and training.  A committee was established to carry out its preparation works, and 2 years later, in 1995, the Institute for Tourism Studies was born. At the same time, Tourism and Hotel School was integrated to the Institute.

Today, THS is one of the schools of the Institute providing courses to a varied range of students who join us with different objectives. Many youngsters attend pre-vocational courses to learn more about the industry before making their own academic and career choices; others, join professional programmes to obtain essential knowledge before start looking for their first job or before setting up their own business; industry staff take assessments to have their skills certified and recognized internationally; some aggressive workers come to acquire more skills and high-level knowledge to further develop their career; some people simply join our courses to learn something different.

With the aim of further developing the local workforce and to push it to a higher level, besides offering courses to the general public, the school also works with local industry partners and community associations, customizing courses according to their needs. Programmes are offered at elementary, intermediate and advanced levels in the following categories: Hospitality and Catering, Heritage and Tourism, Retail, Business and Management, IT and Creative Studies, Health, Spa and Beauty, Language and Culture and Personal Development.

Campus
The Campus of IFT can be divided into the main campus and the Taipa campus.

Main Campus

 Inspiration Building
 Pousada de Mong-Há
 Team Building
 Educational Restaurant

Taipa Campus

Forward building (Chinese: 展望樓)
East Asia Hall (Chinese: 東亞樓) 
It is a student dormitory
銀禧樓 It is a newly open building used for teaching

See also
 List of universities and colleges in Macau

References

External links

Institute for Tourism Studies
List of members of unescobkk
旅遊學院院長黃竹君放眼旅遊業未來

Education in Macau
1995 establishments in Macau
Tourism geography
Educational institutions established in 1995